LHFPL tetraspan subfamily member 3 is a protein that in humans is encoded by the LHFPL3 gene.

Function

This gene is a member of the lipoma HMGIC fusion partner (LHFP) gene family, which is a subset of the superfamily of tetraspan transmembrane protein encoding genes. Mutations in one LHFP-like gene result in deafness in humans and mice, and a second LHFP-like gene is fused to a high-mobility group gene in a translocation-associated lipoma. A partial gene fragment named LHFPL4 corresponds to a portion of the first exon of this gene. [provided by RefSeq, Jul 2008].

References

Further reading